Gunnar Smoliansky (11 July 1933 – 12 December 2019) was a Swedish photographer.

Biography
In 1975, Smoliansky and others founded the Bildhuset Agency. In 1980, he won the Stora Fotographpriset from Photo magazine. In 2005, Smoliansky won the Prix Lennart af Petersens.

References

External links 

 Gunnar Smoliansky at the Deutsche Börse Photography Foundation

1933 births
2019 deaths
Swedish photographers